The 2022 Kirov Oblast gubernatorial election took place on 10–11 September 2022, on common election day. Acting Governor Aleksandr Sokolov was elected for a full term.

Background
Rosreestr Head Igor Vasilyev was appointed Governor of Kirov Oblast in July 2016, replacing Nikita Belykh, who was arrested for taking a bribe. In September 2017 Vasilyev won the election with 64.03% of the vote.

Governor Vasilyev's single term was accompanied by poor management and "disastrous" personal ratings. Vasilyev's position was also weakened by a major corruption scandal in 2020, when Vice Governor Andrey Plitko, Vasliyev's trustee, and Ministry of Forestry Aleksey Shurgin were arrested for bribery. In the 2021 Russian legislative election United Russia scored only 29.54% of the vote in Kirov Oblast, party's 4th worst result nationally. Among rumoured candidates for replacement of Vasilyev were federal Minister of Health Mikhail Murashko, Deputy Presidential Envoy to the Volga Federal District Oleg Mashkovtsev, Rosatom top-manager Mikhail Sandalov and FSB First Deputy Director Sergey Korolev. On 10 May 2022 Igor Vasilyev asked for his resignation along four other governors, Presidential Administration official Aleksandr Sokolov was appointed acting Governor of Kirov Oblast.

Due to the start of Russian special military operation in Ukraine in February 2022 and subsequent economic sanctions the cancellation and postponement of direct gubernatorial elections was proposed. The measure was even supported by A Just Russia leader Sergey Mironov. Eventually, on 9 June Legislative Assembly of Kirov Oblast called gubernatorial election for 11 September 2022.

Candidates
In Kirov Oblast candidates for Governor can be nominated by registered political parties or by self-nomination. Candidate for Governor of Kirov Oblast should be a Russian citizen and at least 30 years old. Candidates for Governor should not have a foreign citizenship or residence permit. Each candidate in order to be registered is required to collect at least 5% of signatures of members and heads of municipalities. In addition self-nominated candidates should collect 0.5% of signatures of Kirov Oblast residents (around 5,000 signatures). Also gubernatorial candidates present 3 candidacies to the Federation Council and election winner later appoints one of the presented candidates.

Registered
 Fyodor Luginin (Rodina), chairman of Rodina regional office
 Sergey Mamayev (CPRF), Member of Legislative Assembly of Kirov Oblast, former Member of State Duma (2011-2016), 2014 and 2017 gubernatorial candidate, 2015 Mari El head candidate
 Yury Moiseyev (Communists of Russia), Member of Tula Oblast Duma, 2021 Tula Oblast gubernatorial candidate
 Vladimir Ponaryev (LDPR), Member of Legislative Assembly of Kirov Oblast
 Aleksandr Sokolov (United Russia), acting Governor of Kirov Oblast, former Deputy Governor of Kostroma Oblast (2014-2017)

Did not file
 Anton Dolgikh (Independent), lawyer, 2017 gubernatorial candidate
 Ilya Ulyanov (Independent), Deputy Chairman of the Central Committee of Communists of Russia party, former Member of Supreme Council of the Republic of Khakassia (2013-2018), perennial candidate

Declined
 Vladimir Kostin (LDPR), Member of Legislative Assembly of Kirov Oblast
 Bagir Sharifov, businessman
 Nadezhda Surayeva (SR-ZP), Member of Kirov City Duma, deputy general director of Kirov Dairy Plant (switched to LDPR)

Candidates for Federation Council
Sergey Mamayev (CPRF):
Vladimir Komoyedov, former Member of State Duma (2007-2016), retired Admiral
Zhanna Simonova, professor at Kirov State Medical University
Marina Sozontova, former Deputy Speaker of Legislative Assembly of Kirov Oblast (2011-2016)

Vladimir Ponaryev (LDPR):
Vladimir Kostin, Member of Legislative Assembly of Kirov Oblast
Vladimir Malkov, coordinator of LDPR regional office
Olga Tyrykina, Member of Legislative Assembly of Kirov Oblast

Aleksandr Sokolov (United Russia):
Viktor Bondarev, incumbent Senator, Chair of Council Committee on Defense and Security
Olesya Redkina (SR-ZP), Member of Legislative Assembly of Kirov Oblast, chief doctor at Kirov Infectious Diseases Hospital
Natalya Shedko, Deputy Chair of Civic Chamber of Kirov Oblast

Finances
All sums are in rubles.

Results

|- style="background-color:#E9E9E9;text-align:center;"
! style="text-align:left;" colspan=2| Candidate
! style="text-align:left;"| Party
! width="75"|Votes
! width="30"|%
|-
| style="background-color:;"|
| style="text-align:left;"| Aleksandr Sokolov (incumbent)
| style="text-align:left;"| United Russia
| 243,492
| 71.85
|-
| style="background-color:|
| style="text-align:left;"| Sergey Mamayev
| style="text-align:left;"| Communist Party
| 45,469
| 13.42
|-
| style="background-color:;"|
| style="text-align:left;"| Vladimir Ponaryev
| style="text-align:left;"| Liberal Democratic Party
| 20,773
| 6.13
|-
| style="background-color:|
| style="text-align:left;"| Fyodor Luginin
| style="text-align:left;"| Rodina
| 15,894
| 4.69
|-
| style="background-color:;"|
| style="text-align:left;"| Yury Moiseyev
| style="text-align:left;"| Communists of Russia
| 5,253
| 1.55
|-
| style="text-align:left;" colspan="3"| Valid votes
| 330,881
| 97.63
|-
| style="text-align:left;" colspan="3"| Blank ballots
| 8,017
| 2.37
|- style="font-weight:bold"
| style="text-align:left;" colspan="3"| Total
| 338,898
| 100.00
|-
| style="background-color:#E9E9E9;" colspan="6"|
|-
| style="text-align:left;" colspan="3"| Turnout
| 338,898
| 33.34
|-
| style="text-align:left;" colspan="3"| Registered voters
| 1,016,583
| 100.00
|-
| colspan="5" style="background-color:#E9E9E9;"|
|- style="font-weight:bold"
| colspan="4" |Source:
|
|}

Incumbent Senator Viktor Bondarev (Independent) was re-appointed to the Federation Council.

See also
2022 Russian gubernatorial elections

References

Kirov Oblast
Kirov Oblast
Politics of Kirov Oblast